Yauli District is one of nineteen districts of the province Huancavelica in Peru.

The capital  of the district is the town of  Yauli.

Ethnic groups 
The people in the district are mainly Indigenous citizens of Quechua descent. Quechua is the language which the majority of the population (88.36%) learnt to speak in childhood, 11.42% of the residents started speaking using the Spanish language (2007 Peru Census).

Places of interest 
The archaeological site Uchkus Inkañan is situated in the district.

References